Ba'a (Baa, Baadale) is the capital of the Indonesian island of Rote and of the Rote Ndao Regency (kabupaten), in the province of East Nusa Tenggara. It lies in the district (kecamatan) of Lobalain, and constitutes a village (desa) with 1,263 inhabitants at the 2020 Census.

Notes 

Rote Ndao Regency
Populated places in East Nusa Tenggara
Regency seats of East Nusa Tenggara